Too Many Wives is a 1933 British comedy film directed by George King and starring Claude Flemming, Alf Goddard and Jack Hobbs. It was a quota quickie made at Teddington Studios by the British subsidiary of Warner Bros.

Cast
 Claude Flemming as Baron von Schlossen  
 Alf Goddard as Jeff 
 Jack Hobbs as John Wildely  
 Viola Keats as Sally  
 Nora Swinburne as Hilary Wildely  
 Charles Paton 
 John Turnbull

References

Bibliography
 Low, Rachael. Filmmaking in 1930s Britain. George Allen & Unwin, 1985.
 Wood, Linda. British Films, 1927-1939. British Film Institute, 1986.

External links

1933 films
British comedy films
1933 comedy films
Films directed by George King
Quota quickies
Films shot at Teddington Studios
Warner Bros. films
British black-and-white films
1930s English-language films
1930s British films